In number theory, Brocard's conjecture is the conjecture that there are at least four prime numbers between (pn)2 and (pn+1)2, where pn is the nth prime number, for every n ≥ 2.  The conjecture is named after Henri Brocard.  It is widely believed that this conjecture is true. However, it remains unproven as of 2022.

The number of primes between prime squares is 2, 5, 6, 15, 9, 22, 11, 27, ... .

Legendre's conjecture that there is a prime between consecutive integer squares directly implies that there are at least two primes between prime squares for pn ≥ 3 since pn+1 − pn ≥ 2.

See also
 Prime-counting function

Notes

Conjectures about prime numbers
Unsolved problems in number theory
Squares in number theory